Ahmed Abdullah and the Solomonic Quintet is an album by trumpeter Ahmed Abdullah's featuring saxophonist David S. Ware, guitarist Masujaa, bassist Fred Hopkins, and drummer Charles Moffett which was recorded in late 1987 and released on the Swedish Silkheart label.

Reception 

The Penguin Guide to Jazz states "the leader is outclassed by his own band. The rhythm section is wonderfully alert and inventive with Masuhjaa's guitar an especially individual presence, and Ware is a gritty improviser" In his review on AllMusic, Ron Wynn states "Trumpeter Ahmed Abdullah sprays around dissonant solos and spearheads an often frenzied set that was his second release for Silkheart. The lineup was exceptional, notably the powerful tenor saxophonist David S. Ware, dynamic bassist Fred Hopkins, and underrated drummer Charles Moffet".

Track listing 
All compositions by Ahmed Abdullah except where noted.
 "African Songbird" – 7:03
 "Gypsy Lady" (Charles Moffett) – 4:55
 "The Search" – 6:48
 "Canto II" – 4:54
 "Khaluma" – 7:16
 "The Dance We Do" – 7:28
 "Wishbone Suite" (Moffett) – 5:27
 "The Dance We Do" [Take 1] – 8:39 Bonus track on CD

Personnel 
Ahmed Abdullah – trumpet, flugelhorn, voice,
David S. Ware – tenor saxophone
Masuhjaa – guitar
Fred Hopkins – bass
Charles Moffett – drums

References 

Ahmed Abdullah albums
1988 albums
Silkheart Records albums